The Battle of Market Street is a college crosstown rivalry between the North Carolina A&T Aggies of North Carolina A&T State University and the UNC Greensboro Spartans of the University of North Carolina at Greensboro. Both programs are the two NCAA Division I schools located in Greensboro, North Carolina. The two schools are separated by about 2.2 miles (or 3.5 kilometers).

College comparison

All-time results

Baseball 
Records since 2005

Note: The 2011 series was cancelled due to inclement weather, the 2020 series was cancelled due to the COVID-19 pandemic.

References 
Primary
 
 
Footnotes

External links 
 North Carolina A&T Athletics
 UNC Greensboro Spartans Athletics

College baseball rivalries in the United States
College basketball rivalries in the United States
College sports rivalries in the United States
College sports in North Carolina
North Carolina A&T Aggies
UNC Greensboro Spartans
Sports in Greensboro, North Carolina
1991 establishments in North Carolina